Lazistan (or ჭანეთი Ç'aneti) is a historical and cultural region of the Caucasus and Anatolia, the term was primarily used during Ottoman rule in the region. Traditionally inhabited by the Laz people and located mostly in Turkey, with small parts in Georgia, its area is about 7,000 km2 (2,703 sq mi) with a modern-day population of around 500,000 (including groups outside of the Laz peoples). 

Geographically, Lazistan consists of a series of narrow, rugged valleys extending northward from the crest of the Pontic Alps, which separate it from the Çoruh Valley, and stretches east–west along the southern shore of the Black Sea. The term “Lazistan” has no longer been in use in Turkey or Georgia since the collapse of the Ottoman Empire.

Etymology 
The ethnonym "Laz" is unhesitatingly linked to a Svan toponym Lazan (i.e. the territorial prefix la- + Zan, "land of the Zan"). The suffix -stan (Persian: ـستان, translit. stân) is Persian for region. The literal translation is, thus, "Region of the Laz". "Lazistan" has also been referred to Lazica or Lazia.

History

Antiquity

Medieval

The Ottoman era

Modern

See also 
 Lazistan Sanjak

Notes

References

External links 
 Map of distribution of Laz people

 
Divided regions
Cultural regions
Historical regions
History of Turkey
Geography of Turkey
Historical regions of Georgia (country)
Laz people